César Ortíz (born 12 August 1949) is a Mexican sports shooter. He competed in the mixed trap event at the 1992 Summer Olympics.

References

1949 births
Living people
Mexican male sport shooters
Olympic shooters of Mexico
Shooters at the 1992 Summer Olympics
Place of birth missing (living people)
20th-century Mexican people